Kai Ko Chen-tung (born Ko Chia-kai on 18 June 1991) is a Taiwanese actor, singer and film director. Ko won Best New Actor at the 48th Golden Horse Awards and the 12th Chinese Film Media Awards for his starring role in the film You Are the Apple of My Eye, also his film debut. In November 2011, Ko released his debut studio album Be Yourself.

Personal life
On August 18, 2014, it was reported that Ko had been arrested on August 14 by the Beijing Police for drug use, along with Jaycee Chan, a Hong Kong actor. Reports from urinalysis showed positive results for marijuana. Ko had appeared in a 2012 anti-drug advertisement in Taiwan where he and other celebrities declared "I don't use drugs". He was released on August 28 and had to face another round of interrogations by the Taipei District Prosecutors Office after returning to Taiwan.

Filmography

Film

Television series

Discography

Awards and nominations

References

External links

Kai Ko at Chinesemov.com

1991 births
Living people
Taiwanese male film actors
Taiwanese Mandopop singers
People from Penghu County
21st-century Taiwanese male actors
21st-century Taiwanese  male singers
Taiwanese film directors